The Indian Super League Golden Glove is an annual association football award presented to the goalkeeper who has kept the most clean sheets in the Indian Super League.

The Indian Super League was founded in 2013, eight teams competed in the 2014 inaugural season. It became the joint top-tier of Indian football league system by 2017–18 season and is the top-tier since 2022–23 season.

Inaugural Indian Super League Golden Glove was awarded to Jan Šeda of Goa in 2014. While Gurpreet Singh Sandhu won the golden glove the most, Amrinder Singh was the first Indian player to win the award with Mumbai City in 2016, and Prabhsukhan Singh Gill was the youngest to win the award at 21 years and 3 months with Kerala Blasters.

Winners

Awards won by nationality

Awards won by club

See also 
 Indian Super League
 Indian Super League Golden Boot
 Indian Super League Hero of the League
 Indian Super League Winning Pass of the League
 Indian Super League Emerging Player of the League

References

External links
 Indian Super League website

Golden Glove
Top sports lists
Awards established in 2014
Association football player non-biographical articles